East China is a geographical and a loosely defined cultural region that covers the eastern coastal area of China.

A concept abolished in 1978, for economical purposes the region was defined from 1949 to 1961 by the Chinese Central Government to include the provinces of (in alphabetical order) Anhui, Fujian, Jiangsu, Shandong and Zhejiang, as well as the municipality of Shanghai. In 1961, the province of Jiangxi was added to the region (previously it was considered part of South Central China).

Since the Chinese government claims Taiwan and the few outlying islands of Fujian (Kinmen and Matsu) governed by the Republic of China (Taiwanese government) as its territory, the claimed "Taiwan Province, People's Republic of China" is also classified in this region.

Administrative divisions

Cities with urban area over one million in population
Provincial capitals in bold.

See also 

 Yangtze River Delta

References

External links 
 

 
Regions of China